is a main-belt binary asteroid. It was discovered through the Beijing Schmidt CCD Asteroid Program at the Xinglong Station in the Chinese province of Hebei on October 22, 1998. A moon was discovered orbiting the asteroid in 2010. The moon has an orbital period of almost exactly a day, and is tidally locked with the asteroid.

See also 
 List of minor planets: 15001–16000

References

External links 
 Asteroids with Satellites, Robert Johnston, johnstonsarchive.net
 

Background asteroids
Discoveries by SCAP
Binary asteroids
19981022